Fighting for Love may refer to:

 Fighting for Love (1917 film), American film
 Fighting for Love (2001 film), Hong Kong film
 Fighting for Love (song), Dami Im song